Emiliano Bonfigli (born February 23, 1989 in Bahía Blanca) is an Argentine footballer who currently plays for Deportes Valdivia in the Segunda División Profesional de Chile.

Career

Club
Bonfigli began his youth career with Tiro Federal de Bahía Blanca and in 2007 joined Rácing Club. In 2010, he joined Club Almagro in Primera B Metropolitana and was one of the league's top scorers with 16 goals. As a result of his play with Almagro he received interest from other South American clubs and in 2011 signed with top Ecuadorean club Manta FC. He is most known by Zerkaa's FIFA Ultimate Team series known as Bigbon.
 Bonfigli appeared in 18 league games for Manta scoring one goal.

During January 2012, Bonfigli participated in the 2012 MLS SuperDraft in hopes of getting selected by a club in Major League Soccer. On January 17, 2012 he was selected by Real Salt Lake in the 2012 MLS Supplemental Draft. Bonfigli was released by Salt Lake on December 3, 2012.

References

External links

wspsoccer.com Profile

1989 births
Living people
Club Almagro players
Argentine footballers
Argentine expatriate footballers
Argentine expatriate sportspeople in Ecuador
Argentine expatriate sportspeople in Mexico
Argentine expatriate sportspeople in the United States
Argentine expatriate sportspeople in Chile
Association football forwards
Club Atlético Atlanta footballers
C.D. Cuenca footballers
Ecuadorian Serie A players
Expatriate footballers in Ecuador
Expatriate soccer players in the United States
Major League Soccer players
Manta F.C. footballers
Real Salt Lake draft picks
Real Salt Lake players
Tampico Madero F.C. footballers
Club Atlético Zacatepec players
C.D. Olimpia players
Expatriate footballers in Chile
Segunda División Profesional de Chile players
Deportes Valdivia footballers
Sportspeople from Bahía Blanca